The 1959 Summer Universiade, also known as the I Summer Universiade, took place in Turin, Italy.

Sports
  Athletics
  Basketball
  Fencing
  Swimming
  Tennis
  Volleyball
  Water polo

Medal table
Italy leads this first edition in the total medals count.

References

External links
  Le Universiadi in Italia

 
1959
U
U
1959 in Italian sport
Multi-sport events in Italy
Sports competitions in Turin
August 1959 sports events in Europe
September 1959 sports events in Europe
1950s in Turin